Fernand Moulet (3 December 1895 – 25 February 1971) was a French racing cyclist. He participated seven times in the Tour de France during the 1920s, but only finished in 1926 and 1928. His older half-brother, Marcel Moulet (1887-1933), also rode as a professional cyclist before World War I.

References

1895 births
1971 deaths
French male cyclists
Place of birth missing